Farouk Kaspaules is an Iraqi-born Canadian artist of Assyrian origin, noted for his engravings and silk-screen photography.

Life and career
Born in Baghdad, Kaspaules left Iraq in the mid-1970s for political reasons. After a brief stay in the United States, he chose Canada as his country of exile and settled in Ottawa. He received his art education at the University of Ottawa, graduating in 1989 with Bachelor degrees in Fine Arts and Art History. 

He has contributed to the arts community in Canada through his active involvement in artist-run centres and community organizations.

He mixes traditional Arabic iconography with modern symbols to produce works that reflect themes of exile, cultural displacement and related social issues.

Work
Kaspaules works in oils and mixed media. He also executes engravings and silk-screen photography. 

During his first European exhibition in London, England, in 1993, he established links with other exiled artists from the Middle East, specifically from Iraq. These encounters led to a turning point in his artistic production, which became more politically explicit. 

In 2001, Kaspaules's installation …and at night we leave our dreams on window sill, memory of a place (2000) was included in the major exhibition The Lands within Me: Expressions by Canadian Artists of Arab Origin, which opened at the Canadian Museum of History soon after the September 11 attacks.

In 2016, Kaspaule exhibited works in There’s Room: Ottawa Artists Respond to the Refugee Crisis, held at Gallery 101.

Kaspaules has participated in some 20 solo and collective exhibitions in Canada, England, Hungary, France, Chile and Brazil.

Solo exhibitions
 1993-  A Personal Memory, Kufa Gallery, London, England
 1995 - Non Sequitur
 2000 - The Lands Within Me – Memory of a Place
 2003 - State of Things
 2003 - The 9th International Cairo Biennale, Cairo, Egypt
 2004 - Crossing Borders
 2005 - Traces
 2006 - Iconoclast
 2007 - Be/Longing Ottawa Art Gallery, Ottawa, Canada
 2008 - Inhabitants, Centre d'exposition L'Imagier, Aylmer, Quebec

See also
 Iraqi art
 Islamic art

References

Year of birth missing (living people)
Living people
Artists from Baghdad
Iraqi Assyrian people
Iraqi emigrants to Canada
Iraqi Christians
Canadian people of Assyrian descent
University of Ottawa alumni